The Pakistani cricket team toured the West Indies from 18 April to 24 May 2011. The tour consisted of two Tests, one Twenty20 International (T20I) and five One Day Internationals (ODIs).

Squads

Tour matches

T20I series

Only T20I

ODI series

1st ODI

2nd ODI

3rd ODI

4th ODI

5th ODI

Test series

1st Test

2nd Test

References

West
Pakistani cricket tours of the West Indies
2010–11 West Indian cricket season
International cricket competitions in 2011
2011 in West Indian cricket